All Skrewed Up is the debut studio album by the British rock band Skrewdriver, released in 1977. It was issued with four different sleeve colours - green, orange, yellow, and pale purple. It was later re-released in 1990 as "The Early Years" with five additional tracks, including the singles "Unbeliever" and "Streetfight", originally issued on the German release. The Early Years is the only official release of the All Skrewed Up tracks on CD.

Ian Stuart Donaldson was the only member of the record's line-up to play on future Skrewdriver releases.

The album contains none of the neo-Nazi-themed and white power-themed lyrics that Skrewdriver used later.

Track listing
All tracks by Ian Stuart Donaldson, except where noted.
 "Where's It Gonna End?" – 2:31
 "Government Action" (Donaldson, Phil Walmsley) – 1:34
 "Back Street Kids" – 1:38
 "Gotta Be Young" (Donaldson, Walmsley) – 1:59
 "I Don't Need Your Love" – 2:01
 "I Don't Like You" (Donaldson, Walmsley) – 1:55
 "An-Ti-So-Cial" (Donaldson, Walmsley) – 1:26
 "(Too Much) Confusion" – 2:32
 "9 Till 5" – 2:04
 "Jailbait" – 1:12
 "We Don't Pose" – 1:49
 "The Only One" – 2:49
 "Won't Get Fooled Again" (Pete Townshend) – 2:24

The tracks "Streetfight" and "Unbeliever" (intended to be the A and B sides on a 7" which never made it past the test pressing stage) were included on the German version of the album as tracks 8 and 12, respectively.

Personnel
Skrewdriver
 Ian Stuart Donaldson – vocals 
 Phil Walmsley – guitar
 Kevin McKay – bass
 John "Grinny" Grinton – drums
 Kevin Wilson – vocals
Technical
 Neil Richmond – engineer

References

Sources
All Skrewed Up at Discogs

1977 debut albums
Skrewdriver albums
Oi! albums
Chiswick Records albums